Tom Skjønberg (8 October 1948 – 12 March 2019) is a Norwegian sailor. He was born in Oslo, but represented the club Bærum SF. He competed at the 1976 Summer Olympics in Montreal, where he placed 24th in the Finn class. He died at the age of 70.

References

External links 
 

1948 births
2019 deaths
Sportspeople from Oslo
Norwegian male sailors (sport)
Olympic sailors of Norway
Sailors at the 1976 Summer Olympics – Finn